Desmia ploralis, the mournful desmia moth, is a moth in the family Crambidae. It was described by Achille Guenée in 1854. It is found in French Guiana, Suriname, Brazil, Guatemala, Costa Rica, Mexico, the Caribbean and Florida.

References

Moths described in 1854
Desmia
Moths of North America
Moths of South America